James Endicott (May 8, 1865 – March 9, 1954) was a Canadian church leader, missionary and administrator.

Life and career
Endicott was born in Devon, England. He emigrated to Canada with his family at the age of seventeen and grew up in a farming community on the Canadian Prairies. 

Endicott studied at Wesley College in Winnipeg, Manitoba, and was ordained as a Methodist minister in 1893. He was elected Moderator of the United Church of Canada by the 2nd General Council in Montreal, Quebec, in 1926.

Endicott and his wife moved to Chengtu, Sichuan Province, China, in 1894 as missionaries and were integral to the development of the Methodist mission already in place there. He was very influenced by the social gospel movement and was greatly impacted by the plight of the poor and oppressed he encountered while in China. The Endicotts and their five children returned to Canada in 1910 due to the poor health of their youngest daughter and settled in Toronto where James Endicott became General Secretary of the Board of Foreign Missions of the Methodist Church of Canada in 1913. He continued in this position after union with the United Church of Canada until his retirement in 1937.

Endicott was a leading figure in efforts to merge the Methodist, Congregationalist and Presbyterian churches leading to the creation of the United Church of Canada in 1925. He served as Moderator of the United Church of Canada from 1926 to 1928. He was recommended highly to this position by his predecessor, George C. Pidgeon, because of his dedication to and enthusiasm for missionary work. He also served as head of the Foreign Missions Board of the United Church from its founding until his retirement in 1937 and remained a leading figure in the denomination until the end of his life. His son, James Gareth Endicott, was also a minister and missionary in China and was close friends with Lester B. Pearson.

See also 
 Christianity in Sichuan
 Methodism in Sichuan

References

1865 births
1954 deaths
Moderators of the United Church of Canada
Canadian Methodist ministers
Canadian Methodist missionaries
Methodist missionaries in Canada
Methodist missionaries in Sichuan
English emigrants to Canada
Canadian expatriates in China